Fruitlands Museum in Harvard, Massachusetts, is a museum about multiple visions of America on the site of the short-lived utopian community, Fruitlands. The museum includes the Fruitlands farmhouse (a National Historic Landmark), a museum about Shaker life, an art gallery with 19th-century landscape paintings, vernacular American portraits, and other changing exhibitions, and a museum of Native American history.

Visitors can tour the farmhouse, which has been restored to appear as it did during the 1840s, and exhibits about Transcendentalism and the Alcott family. Fruitlands offers a diverse schedule of contemporary exhibits, lectures, outdoor concerts and easy walking trails. There is also a museum store and restaurant.  The properties are overseen by The Trustees of Reservations.

History
Fruitlands, inspired by Transcendentalism and Amos Bronson Alcott's ideas of societal reform, was established on  purchased by Charles Lane in May 1843. People interested in joining the community began moving in the next month and the site was optimistically named "Fruitlands" despite having only a small cluster of apple trees. The community was based on self-sufficiency, using no hired labor and growing all the food they needed themselves. The community ultimately failed because of the difficulty in growing crops. Community members began moving away as early as October 1843; Lane and Alcott abandoned it in January 1844.

The property was purchased in 1910 by Clara Endicott Sears, who opened the farmhouse to the public in 1914 as a museum. In addition to the Fruitlands building, the site now includes a transplanted Shaker house from the nearby Harvard Shaker Village, Native American artifacts and Hudson River School paintings. The museum is primarily the result of the efforts of Sears, a preservationist.

From 2015 through 2019, Fruitlands was the site of an amateur cyclocross race. Notorious for the rough surface of the course as well as the often muddy off-cambers utilized, it  became a favorite amongst the New England cyclocross community. No race was held in 2020, the first year of the COVID-19 pandemic.  As of July 2021, no further races have been scheduled.

The Trustees of Reservations
From 1930 until 2016, Fruitlands was an independent non-profit organization.  In 2016, the museum merged with The Trustees of Reservations.  From a report in the Boston Globe: “'Fruitlands and The Trustees’ missions are so well aligned in our desire to build connections between nature, art, and culture among people of all ages and to provide opportunities for lifelong learning and engagement,' said Marie LeBlanc, chairwoman of the Fruitlands board. 'We are confident that The Trustees will provide the platform Fruitlands needs to continue to grow, care for, and share its important legacy and collections.'" Michael Busack currently serves as the museum director since his appointment in 2019.

See also
 National Register of Historic Places listings in Worcester County, Massachusetts

References

Sources

External links

 Fruitlands Museum The Trustees of Reservations
 Trail map

1914 establishments in Massachusetts
Art museums and galleries in Massachusetts
Buildings and structures in Harvard, Massachusetts
Historic districts in Worcester County, Massachusetts
Historic house museums in Massachusetts
Houses in Worcester County, Massachusetts
Museums in Worcester County, Massachusetts
National Register of Historic Places in Worcester County, Massachusetts
Native American museums in Massachusetts
Open-air museums in Massachusetts
Shaker communities or museums
Shingle Style architecture in Massachusetts
The Trustees of Reservations